A guayo is a Cuban percussion instrument. It may also refer to:
A grater, in the Caribbean
Guayo Cedeño (born 1974), Honduran musician

Places 
 Guayo River, Puerto Rico
 Guayo, Adjuntas, Puerto Rico, a barrio in Adjuntas, Puerto Rico
 Guayos, town in Cuba